Erdenes Tavantolgoy (abbreviated as ETT JSC) is the largest coal exporter in Mongolia. It is a state-owned company.

History 

In December 2022, protests broke out in response to the company exporting coal to China.

References 

Mining companies of Mongolia
Coal companies of Mongolia
Government-owned companies of Mongolia
2010 establishments in Mongolia
Companies established in 2010